Cornelius O'Callaghan (1809 – 16 August 1849) of Shanbally Castle, Clogheen, Co. Tipperary, was an Irish politician.  He sat in the House of Commons of the United Kingdom as a Member of Parliament (MP) for Tipperary from 1832 to 1835,
and for Dungarvan from 1837 to 1841.

Shanbally Castle was built for his father, Cornelius O'Callaghan, 1st Viscount Lismore who outlived him, so his brother George inherited the title and estate.

References

External links 
 

1809 births
1849 deaths
Members of the Parliament of the United Kingdom for County Tipperary constituencies (1801–1922)
UK MPs 1832–1835
UK MPs 1837–1841
Members of the Parliament of the United Kingdom for County Waterford constituencies (1801–1922)
Whig (British political party) MPs for Irish constituencies
Heirs apparent who never acceded